Voetbalvereniging Sparta Nijkerk, is an association football club from Nijkerk, Netherlands. The club was founded in 1931, is currently (season 2022/2023) playing in the Derde Divisie.

History 
In one of their most notable matches of recent memory, Sparta Nijkerk lost 2-0 to ADO Den Haag in the first round of the 2021–22 KNVB Cup.

In the 2021–22 season, Sparta Nijkerk qualified for the promotion playoffs, but lost 3–1 on aggregate to HSC '21 in the first round.

References

External links
 Official site

Sparta Nijkerk
Football clubs in the Netherlands
Association football clubs established in 1931
1931 establishments in the Netherlands
Football clubs in Nijkerk